= Tanda Naroor =

- Village
- Country: India
- State: Punjab
- District: Kapurthala
- Tehsil: Phagwara

Government
  - Type: Panchayat raj
  - Body: Gram panchayat

Area
  - Total: 98.74 ha (244.0 acres)

Population (2011)
  - Total: 92; 49/43 ♂/♀
  - Scheduled Castes: 0
  - Total Households: 17

Languages
  - Official: Punjabi
- Time zone: UTC+5:30 (IST)
- ISO 3166 code: IN-PB
- Website: kapurthala.gov.in

Tanda Naroor is a village in Phagwara in Kapurthala district of Punjab State, India. It is located 23 kilometres (14 mi) from sub district headquarter and 58 kilometres (36 mi) from district headquarter. The village is administrated by Sarpanch an elected representative of the village.

== Demography ==
As of 2011, The village has a total number of 17 houses and the population of 92 of which 49 are males while 43 are females. According to the report published by Census India in 2011, The village does not have any Schedule Caste or Schedule Tribe population so far.

== See also ==
- List of villages in India
